WLSE is a Christian radio station licensed to Canton, Illinois, broadcasting on 103.3 MHz FM. It is owned by Lifestyle Education Academy International, Inc. WLSE airs programming from LifeTalk Radio, along with local talk and Christian contemporary music.

History
The Federal Communications Commission allocated the empty frequency 103.3 MHz (channel 277A) to Canton, Illinois in August 2001 to make up for the empty 98.3 MHz (channel 252A) allocation being moved to Abingdon, Illinois.

WLSE received its broadcast license on December 12, 2013.

Translators
WLSE is simulcast on 98.5 WLSB in Augusta, Illinois, and is also heard in Pekin, Illinois through a translator at 99.1 MHz and in the Peoria area through a translator on 104.3 MHz. These translators were originally owned by the Illinois Association of Seventh Day Adventists, and were sold to LSE Broadcasting in 2017.

References

External links
WLSE's website
Canton Seventh-day Adventist Church's website

2013 establishments in Illinois
Radio stations established in 2013
Canton, Illinois
LSE